Norman Rowe may refer to:

Norman Lester Rowe (1915–1991), British surgeon
Norm Rowe (1926–2016), Canadian rower
Normie Rowe (born 1947), Australian singer-songwriter